Allen Chapel African Methodist Episcopal Church is a church in Terre Haute, Indiana.

The church is named for Richard Allen, who founded the African Methodist Episcopal Church in Philadelphia in 1787. The congregation in Terre Haute began meeting in 1837 in a small white church in town. This original structure had a tunnel beneath it that led to bank of the Wabash River for escaped slaves going toward Canada on the Underground Railroad. Many of the congregation's early members were freed slaves who had been brought to the area by Quakers.

In the mid-19th century, Frederick Douglass went to Terre Haute on two occasions to raise funds for the congregation. Other eminent speakers have included Eugene V. Debs and Jackie Robinson.

The current structure was built in 1913, and is a yellow brick and stone church with a prominent corner tower. It was placed on the National Register of Historic Places in 1975 for its significance in religion, social history, and African American history.

References

Churches on the National Register of Historic Places in Indiana
National Register of Historic Places in Terre Haute, Indiana
African Methodist Episcopal churches in Indiana
Churches completed in 1913
20th-century Methodist church buildings in the United States
Churches on the Underground Railroad
1837 establishments in Indiana
Churches in Vigo County, Indiana